Column X is a 1929 German silent crime film directed by Reinhold Schünzel and starring Schünzel, Ernst Stahl-Nachbaur and Grete Reinwald. The film attempted to imitate the style of American crime films, switched to a German setting. It was shot at the Tempelhof Studios in Berlin and premiered at the city's Marmorhaus cinema.

Cast
 Reinhold Schünzel as Robert Sandt, Führer der Kolonne X
 Ernst Stahl-Nachbaur as Kriminalkommissar Weigert
 Grete Reinwald as Irene Mahler
 Olga Engl as Tant Eulalia
 Oskar Sima
 Arthur Duarte
 Gerhard Ritterband as Mitglied der Kolonne X
 Otto Wallburg

References

Bibliography

External links

1929 films
Films of the Weimar Republic
German silent feature films
German crime films
Films directed by Reinhold Schünzel
1929 crime films
German black-and-white films
1920s German films
Films shot at Tempelhof Studios